Johanna Konta was the defending champion, but lost in the first round to Agnieszka Radwańska in a rematch of the previous year's final.

Angelique Kerber won the title, defeating Ashleigh Barty in the final, 6–4, 6–4. Kerber won the title despite being two match points down in the second set in her first-round match against Lucie Šafářová.

Seeds
The top two seeds received a bye into the second round.

Draw

Finals

Top half

Bottom half

Qualifying

Seeds

Qualifiers

Lucky losers

Qualifying draw

First qualifier

Second qualifier

Third qualifier

Fourth qualifier

References
 Main Draw
 Qualifying Draw

Women's Singles